Naveen Kasturia (born 26 January 1985) is an Indian actor known for his work in TVF drama series TVF Pitchers and Aspirants. He also appeared in lead actor in the critically acclaimed film Sulemani Keeda. He received critical acclaim and immense fame for his role of Abhilash in TVF Aspirants.

He started his career working as an assistant director on the film Jashnn and then assisted Dibakar Banerjee on Love Sex Aur Dhokha and Shanghai. He also appeared in Bose: Dead/Alive and played leading roles in Waah Zindagi, Thinkistan, Happily Ever After and Runaway Lugai.

Early life 
Naveen was born in Otukpo, a small town in Nigeria. Though his family moved back to India when he was a year old. He was brought up in a joint family in Delhi. He did his schooling from Birla Vidya Niketan and engineering from Netaji Subhas Institute of Technology (now NSUT) in Delhi. 

He directed a lot of skits/plays in his school and college days. After graduation, he joined an analytics firm called Inductis in Gurgaon in 2006, where he worked for two years before moving to Mumbai in 2008. In Mumbai, he worked with JP Morgan Chase for a very brief period of time before making a final switch to films.

Career 
Naveen continued doing theatre after engineering. In 2007, Naveen and his college friends started a theatre company, Right Click Entertainment, and wrote and directed his first ticketed play Khel Khel Mein, which went housefull. He worked as an assistant director in Jashnn, produced by Vishesh Films.

Naveen got his first television commercial when he went to meet Dibakar Banerjee since he wanted to assist Dibakar Banerjee as an AD, and Banerjee asked him to work in his coke commercial. As of now, Naveen Kasturia has worked in many advertisements for various brands such as Vodafone, Mahindra, Tapzo app, Marathe Jewellers, True Value and so on. Later, he assisted Dibakar Banerjee in LSD and Shanghai, and Oscar-winning director Danis Tanović in an international film called Tigers.

In 2011, Amit Masurkar offered a movie to Kasturia, named Sulemani Keeda. Released in 2014, the movie proved to be a turning point in his career. Naveen did a few more sketches with The Viral Fever before Pitchers happened. 

In 2022, he also appeared in a podcast on Spotify, 'Bhaskar Bose: A Hindi Thriller Podcast' (season 3 - 'Bhaskar Bose in a Perfect World' ) playing the role of Bhaskar Bose from a Parallel World. The podcast was created by MNM Talkies.

Filmography

Films

Web series

Short films

References

External links

Living people
Indian male film actors
1985 births